The William Goadby Loew House is a mansion located at 56 East 93rd Street on the Upper East Side of Manhattan in New York City.

History
The house was constructed in 1931 for William Goadby Loew, a stockbroker. It was designed by Walker & Gillette in the English Regency style. Formerly known as the Smithers Alcoholism Center, the Spence School's Lower School is now located there.

The house was added to the National Register of Historic Places in 1982. It is located beside the former Virginia Fair Vanderbilt mansion at 60 East 93rd Street.

See also
National Register of Historic Places listings in Manhattan from 59th to 110th Streets

References

Further reading

External links 

Architectural pictures and history listing on Daytonian in Manhattan page The William Goadby Loew House - 56 East 93rd Street

Houses on the National Register of Historic Places in Manhattan
Houses completed in 1931
Upper East Side
Houses in Manhattan